Mahendravarman ruled Kamarupa from the Varman dynasty for the period 470–494 CE, was son of King Ganapativarman and Queen Yajnavati.

Successor
He married Suvrata and had successor to throne named Narayanavarman.

Characteristics
It is said that he mastered his self, and worked towards the stability (of the rule) of world, who like Janaka (or his father) was well versed in the principles of the philosophy of the (supreme) Self.

See also
 Balavarman
 Kalyanavarman

References

Further reading

 
 
 
 
 
 
 
 
 
 
 
 

Varman dynasty
5th-century Indian monarchs